Mike Bauer was the defending champion, but lost in the semifinals this year.

Peter Doohan won the title, defeating Huub van Boeckel 1–6, 6–1, 6–4 in the final.

Seeds

  Mike Bauer (semifinals)
  Tim Mayotte (quarterfinals)
  Miloslav Mečíř (quarterfinals)
 n/a
  John Fitzgerald (semifinals)
  John Frawley (quarterfinals)
  Tarik Benhabiles (first round)
  Brad Drewett (second round)

Draw

Finals

Top half

Bottom half

External links
 1984 South Australian Open draw

Singles